Binodpur Union is a union parishad situated at Mohammadpur Upazila,  in Magura District, Khulna Division of Bangladesh. There are 21 villages and 7 mouzas in the union.

References

External links
 

Unions of Khulna Division
Unions of Mohammadpur Upazila
Unions of Magura District